Zaldy is a masculine given name. Notable people with the name include:

 Zaldy Ampatuan, Filipino mass murderer and ex-politician
 Zaldy Goco, American fashion designer
 Zaldy Realubit, Filipino basketball player
 Zaldy Villa, Filipino politician
 Zaldy Zshornack, Filipino actor

Filipino masculine given names